Hillshaw Head is a hill in the Culter Hills range, part of the Southern Uplands of Scotland. An extension to the Clyde Wind Farm was commissioned in 2017 which partially built upon its slopes. It is most frequently climbed with the neighbouring hills as part of a round.

Subsidiary SMC Summits

References

Mountains and hills of the Southern Uplands
Mountains and hills of South Lanarkshire
Mountains and hills of the Scottish Borders
Donald mountains